Artemisia (before 1927: Τσερνίτσα - Tsernitsa) is a mountain village in the municipality of Kalamata, Messenia, Greece.  , it had a population of 136 for the village and 142 for the municipal district, which includes the small village Agios Ioannis Theologos. It is situated at 860 m above sea level.  Many of its residents live there only during the summer months.

It is located in the west part of the Taygetos mountains on the GR-82 (Pylos - Kalamata - Sparta) between Kalamata and Sparta. It is 1.5 km southwest of Alagonia and 13 km northeast of Kalamata.

Population

History

Until 1927, the village was named Tsernitsa. From 1835 until 1912, it was part of the municipality of Alagonia. In 1912 it became an independent community, which joined the municipality of Kalamata in 1997.

See also

List of settlements in Messenia

External links
Artemisia at the GTP Travel Pages

References

Kalamata
Populated places in Messenia